Black P. Stones Jungles is a division ("set") of the Bloods street gang in some parts of Los Angeles.

Overview

History
The Black P Stones Jungles first emerged in California in 1969 and had operated in the West Adams area of Los Angeles. Over the years the P Stones had grown into one of the larger gangs that were in South Los Angeles. There were an estimated 700 members of the Black P Stones, of whom used to live in Baldwin Village.

Territory
The BPS consisted of two separate gangs: The City Stone Bloods, also known as the "bity" in the Mid-City/Arlington Heights area, and the Jungle Stone Bloods, the exclusive area that was once known as the Jungles (during the 1960s to the early 2000s) now officially known as Baldwin Village, Los Angeles on the West Side of South Central Los Angeles, saw 28 murders and more than 1,500 assaults from 2000 to 2005.

Intergang relations
In 1972, the LA Brims, Piru St Boys, Athens Park Boys, Bishops, Denver Lanes, Pueblos and Lueders Park Hustlers founded the Bloods after constant attacks on independent gangs by the Crips in addition to Crip and Crip rivalries that also began to surface. BPS, in later years, joined the Bloods movement and founded their own factions Jungle Stones & city/Bity stones

LAPD raids
On November 10, 2005, the FBI Los Angeles Office and Los Angeles Police Department carried out many police raids against alleged BPS members accused of conspiracy and drug trafficking in a joint effort called "Operation Stone Cold". At least 18 people were arrested. There was also another police raid in 2011 arresting at least 30 to 40 members.

Ownership crackdown
The Los Angeles City Attorney and prosecutors are heavily targeting property owners and managers of the Chesapeake Apartments, (a 425-unit apartment complex spread over more than 17 acres and was a longtime stronghold for a street gang called the BPS) to solve  crime. LAPD has also conducted police raids and arrests among the apartment buildings as well, which decreased crime within that area dramatically.

Continual arrests
LAPD has continued to make arrests against members, while many members are being pushed out the city limits altogether.

In the media
The 2001 film Training Day, starring Denzel Washington, was filmed on a cul-de-sac in Baldwin Village, and featured Cle Shaheed Sloan of Athens Park. Additionally, the gang was featured in another film that year, Baby Boy. The Jungles appear in season 2, episode 1 of the television series Southland and season 1, episode 12 of Gang Related, as well as the music video for the Waka Flocka Flame song "Hard in da Paint".

See also
 Gangs in Los Angeles
 People Nation
 Black P. Stones
 African-American organized crime

Notes

Organizations established in 1969
1969 establishments in California
Jungles
Bloods sets
Gangs in Los Angeles
African-American organized crime groups